Comendite is a hard, peralkaline igneous rock, a type of light blue grey rhyolite. Phenocrysts are sodic sanidine with minor albite and bipyramidal quartz. Comendite occurs in the mountains Tibrogargan, Coonowrin, Tunbubudla, Coochin, Saddleback, Tibberoowuccum and Ngungun in the Glass House Mountains, South East Queensland, Australia.  The blue colour is caused by very small crystals of riebeckite or arfvedsonite. Comendite also occurs in Sardinia, Corsica, Ascension Island, Ethiopia, Somalia and other areas of East Africa.
The 1903 eruption of Changbaishan volcano in north-east China erupted comendite pumice.

Comendite derives its name from the area of Le Commende on San Pietro Island in Italy, where the rock type is found.

References

Volcanic rocks